Chasen Cord "Chase" Hampton (born January 12, 1975) is an American actor, performer, singer, songwriter, musician, and mentor.

Early life and career

Personal life
On July 28, 2012, Hampton married Lisa Cinelli, a former girlfriend from his teenage years with whom he had recently reunited. The two originally met in 1989 on the set of The All-New Mickey Mouse Club when Cinelli was a visiting audience member. Their initial courtship lasted into Hampton's tenure as a member of The Party. The couple divide their time between Hampton's home in Los Angeles and Cinelli's residence just outside Boston, Massachusetts. They have two children, daughter Everly Love (born on October 20, 2016) and son Hayes Deacon (born March 12, 2018).

Filmography

Discography

With The Party
 The Party (1990)
 In the Meantime, In Between Time (1991)
 Free (1992)
 The Party's Over...Thanks for Coming (1993)
 Greatest Hits (1997)

With Buzzfly
 "Wicked Ocean" (feat. Tony Lucca & Mike Vizcarra) – Digital Single (February 1, 2012)
 "Believe" (feat. Nathan Worden & Mike Vizcarra) – Digital Single (March 1, 2012)

Solo
 Something To Believe EP (May 16, 2007)
 Drugstore Girls EP (August 20, 2010)
 "I Can't Breathe" (feat. Reks, Dutch Rebelle & American Antagon1st) – Digital Single (March 20, 2015)
 "I'd Die Without You" (feat. Deedee Magno Hall) (P.M. Dawn cover) – Digital Single (April 12, 2019)
 "Nobody" – Digital Single (May 28, 2021)

References

External links
 

American male child actors
American male film actors
American male singers
American male television actors
Mouseketeers
Male actors from Oklahoma City
1975 births
Living people
Native American male actors
Musicians from Oklahoma City
21st-century American singers